The 1919 Oregon Webfoots football team represented the University of Oregon in the 1919 college football season. It was the Webfoots' 27th overall and fourth season as a member of the Pacific Coast Conference (PCC). Home games were played at Kincaid Field and Hayward Field in Eugene, and at Multnomah Field in Portland.

The inaugural game at Hayward Field was the rivalry against Oregon Agricultural on November 15. It hosted varsity football through 1966, and continues as an elite track and field venue.

Schedule

References

Oregon
Oregon Ducks football seasons
Pac-12 Conference football champion seasons
Oregon Webfoots football